In molecular biology, DCTN6 is that subunit of the dynactin protein complex that is encoded by the p27 gene. Dynactin is the essential component for microtubule-based cytoplasmic dynein motor activity in intracellular transport of a variety of cargoes and organelles.

Identification and structure
DCTN6 was first identified and cloned as a subunit of the "pointed-end complex" of dynactin through biochemical purification.

X-ray crystal structure revealed that dynactin p27 forms an unusual left handed β-helix (LβH) domain, and its phosphorylation site T186 is in C-terminal disordered segment.

Function

In intracellular transport
Dynactin p27 forms a hetero-dimer with the other dynactin pointed-end complex subunit p25/DCTN5 in 1:1 ratio, and it is essential for p25 stability since they are co-knockdown by p27 RNAi. However, both p27 and p25 are not required for 19S dynactin complex integrity verified by velocity sedimentation. p27/DCTN6 and other dynactin pointed-end complex subunits (Arp11/Actr10, p62/DCTN4, and p25/DCTN5) have been suggested to be involved in dynactin binding to specific intracellular cargoes. Co-depletion of dynactin p27 and p25 by p27 RNAi affects dynactin binding to endomembrane, and early and recycling endosome movements are impaired, suggesting that p27/p25 form a selective endomembrane cargo-targeting module.

In mitosis
In mitosis, unlike dynactin or dynein perturbation that causes mitotic spindle disarrangement and mitotic arrest, dynactin p27/p25 depletion does not affect mitotic spindle formation, pole focusing or dynein/dynactin targeting to kinetochores. However, dynactin p27/p25 are required for normal chromosome alignment, kinetochore-microtubule interaction, and proper timing of anaphase onset. Dynactin p27 C-terminal T186 residue is phosphorylated by cyclin-dependent kinase 1 (Cdk1) in mitosis and helps target polo-like kinase 1 (Plk1) to kinetochores during prometaphase. This activity facilitates phosphorylation of important downstream kinetochore targets (such as tension-sensing 3F3/2 phospho-epitope) of Plk1, which is important for recruitment of spindle assembly checkpoint proteins such as Mad1 and proper kinetochore-microtubule attachment.

References 

Human proteins
Motor proteins